This is a list of the National Register of Historic Places listings in Mahaska County, Iowa.

This is intended to be a complete list of the properties and districts on the National Register of Historic Places in Mahaska County, Iowa, United States.  Latitude and longitude coordinates are provided for many National Register properties and districts; these locations may be seen together in a map.

There are 48 properties and districts listed on the National Register in the county.

Current listings

|}

Former listings
One property was formerly listed but has been removed:

|}

See also

 List of National Historic Landmarks in Iowa
 National Register of Historic Places listings in Iowa
 Listings in neighboring counties: Jasper, Keokuk, Marion, Monroe, Poweshiek, Wapello

References

Mahaska

Buildings and structures in Mahaska County, Iowa